German submarine U-526 was a Type IXC/40 U-boat of Nazi Germany's Kriegsmarine built for service during World War II.

Her keel was laid down on 14 October 1941 by the Deutsche Werft in Hamburg as yard number 341. She was launched on 3 June 1942 and commissioned on 12 August with Kapitänleutnant Hans Möglich in command.

The U-boat's service began with training as part of the 4th U-boat Flotilla on 12 August 1942. She then moved to the 10th flotilla on 1 February 1943 for operations.

She was a member of four wolfpacks.

She carried out one patrol and sank no ships.

She was sunk by mines in the Bay of Biscay on 14 April 1943.

Design
German Type IXC/40 submarines were slightly larger than the original Type IXCs. U-526 had a displacement of  when at the surface and  while submerged. She had two shafts and two  propellers.

U-526 was fitted with six  torpedo tubes (four fitted at the bow and two at the stern), 22 torpedoes, one  SK C/32 naval gun, 180 rounds, and a  SK C/30 as well as a  C/30 anti-aircraft gun. The boat had a complement of forty-eight.

Service history

Patrol and loss
The submarine's only patrol was preceded by short passages from Kiel in Germany to Kristiansand then Bergen in Norway over January 1943. She left Bergen and sailed across the North Sea and into the Atlantic Ocean through the 'gap' between Iceland and the Faroe Islands. Following extensive sweeps in the middle of the North Atlantic, she was crossing the Bay of Biscay and had almost reached Lorient when she encountered mines and was sunk on 14 April 1943. Forty-two men died, but there were twelve survivors.

References

Bibliography

External links

World War II submarines of Germany
German Type IX submarines
1942 ships
U-boats commissioned in 1942
U-boats sunk in 1943
U-boats sunk by mines
Ships built in Hamburg
Maritime incidents in April 1943